Luis de la Sierra Fernández (Santander, 1920 – Palma de Mallorca, 11 October 2014) was a Spanish writer, historian and sailor mostly known for his naval military history and travelling books.

Biography 
When he was 17 years old, during the Spanish Civil War, he enrolled as a sailor on the National Navy serving in the light cruiser Almirante Cervera. When the war was over, he was accepted in the Escuela Naval Militar (Military Navy School) of San Fernando (Cádiz), where, in 1943, he obtained the rank of alférez de navío (ensign). He specialized in submarine warfare and Torpedoes. During his long career he served in several minelayers, cruisers and the schoolships Galatea and Juan Sebastián Elcano. He finished his military career teaching at the Escuela de Armas Submarinas (Submarine Arms School) until 1982.

His first book was the renowned "Buques suicidas. Historia de los submarinos de bolsillo, torpedos humanos y botes explosivos en el siglo XX" published by the Spanish Navy and winner of a Virgen del Carmen prize in 1963. Its success paved the way for his writing career, mainly made of naval history books, particularly the naval engagements of both world wars, traveling books and guides along with a few translations to Spanish of international authors. During his writing career he frequently moved between Almería, Barcelona, Cádiz, Cartagena, Madrid, Palma de Mallorca and Santander to complete his research.

Books 
Most of his books are yet to translated into English, consequently the original title in Spanish has been preserved.

Naval history 

 Buques suicidas. Historia de los submarinos de bolsillo, torpedos humanos y botes explosivos en el siglo XX. Barcelona, España: Juventud. 1958. .
 Titanes azules. Acciones navales de la segunda guerra mundial. Barcelona, España: Juventud. 1963. .
 Corsarios alemanes en la Segunda Guerra Mundial. Barcelona, España: Juventud. 1969. .
 La guerra naval en el Atlántico (1939–1945). Barcelona, España: Juventud. 1974. .
 La guerra naval en el Mediterráneo (1940–1943). Barcelona, España: Juventud. 1976. .
 La guerra naval en el Pacífico (1940–1943). Barcelona, España: Juventud. 1979. .
 El mar en la Gran Guerra (1914–1918). Barcelona, España: Juventud. 1984. .
 Corsarios alemanes en la gran guerra (1914–1918). Barcelona, España: Juventud. 1985. .

Travel 

 Viajes de un marino. Barcelona, España: Juventud. 1981. .
 Viaje a Egipto: doce días en el legendario País del Nilo. Barcelona, España: Ediciones del Serbal. 1990. .
 Viaje a Mesoamérica: por tierras de México, Guatemala y Honduras. Barcelona, España: Ediciones del Serbal. 1991. .
 Viaje a la India. Barcelona, España: Ediciones del Serbal. 1993. .
 Viaje a China. Barcelona, España: Ediciones del Serbal. 1995. .
 Viaje a la Atlántida. Vigo, Pontevedra, España: Ediciones Cardeñoso. 2003. .
 Mis viajes. Vigo, Pontevedra, España: Ediciones Cardeñoso. 2004. .

Translations 

 Müllenheim-Rechberg, Burkard von (1982). El acorazado "Bismarck". Relato de un superviviente. Barcelona, España: Juventud. .
Heyerdahl, Thor (1972). Expedición. Barcelona, España: Juventud. .
 Heyerdahl, Thor (1973). Las expediciones Ra. Barcelona, España: Juventud. .
 Heyerdahl, Thor (1981). La expedición Tigris. Barcelona, España: Juventud. .
 Slocum, Joshua (1981). Navegando en solitario alrededor del mundo. Barcelona, España: Juventud. .
 Heyerdahl, Thor (1986). El misterio de las Maldivas. Barcelona, España: Juventud. .
 Calhoun, Raymond C. (1986). Tifón, el otro enemigo. Barcelona, España: Juventud. .
Chichester, Francis (1993). La vuelta al mundo del Gipsy Moth. Barcelona, España: Juventud. .

References 

People from Santander, Spain
20th-century Spanish historians
21st-century Spanish historians
20th-century Spanish writers
21st-century Spanish writers
Spanish naval officers
1920 births
2014 deaths